Beware of Ladies is a 1936 American crime film directed by Irving Pichel and starring Donald Cook, Judith Allen and George Meeker. A female newspaper reporter is sent by her editor to cover a political contest between a naïve newcomer and a seasoned and corrupt veteran.

Main cast
 Donald Cook as George Martin  
 Judith Allen as Betty White  
 George Meeker as Freddie White  
 Goodee Montgomery as Gertie  
 Russell Hopton as Randy Randall  
 William Newell as Sniff 
 Dwight Frye as Swanson  
 Thomas E. Jackson as Albert Simmons  
 Josephine Whittell as Alice McDonald  
 William Crowell as Tony Baxter  
 Robert Strange as John Williams  
 Robert Emmett Keane as Charles Collins  
 Eric Wilton as Henry - Martin's Chauffeur  
 Phil Dunham as J. Robert Slank

References

Bibliography
 Philippa Gates. Detecting Women: Gender and the Hollywood Detective Film. SUNY Press, 2011.

External links
 

1936 films
1936 crime films
American crime films
Films directed by Irving Pichel
Republic Pictures films
American black-and-white films
Films produced by Nat Levine
1930s English-language films
1930s American films